Placosaris labordalis is a species of moth of the family Crambidae described by Pierre Viette in 1958. It is found in eastern Madagascar.

Its wingspan is 20–23 mm, with a length of the forewings of 9.5–11 mm. Its pattern is close to Placosaris triticalis.

The holotype had been collected near Anosibé in eastern Madagascar.

References

Moths described in 1958
Spilomelinae
Moths of Madagascar
Moths of Africa